Fidel Ramón Miño Medina (born 24 April 1957, in Itauguá, Paraguay) is a former football midfielder. He was part of Paraguay's squad for the 1983 Copa América tournament.

Honours

Club
 Olimpia
 Paraguayan Primera División: 1983, 1985, 1988, 1989
 Copa Libertadores: 1990
Supercopa Sudamericana: 1990
Recopa Sudamericana: 1990

References

External links
 

1957 births
Living people
People from Itauguá
Paraguay international footballers
Paraguayan footballers
Club Sol de América footballers
Club Nacional footballers
Club Olimpia footballers
Sportivo Luqueño players
Paraguayan Primera División players
1983 Copa América players
Association football midfielders